Manchester College Historic District is a national historic district located at North Manchester, Wabash County, Indiana. It encompasses three contributing buildings and one contributing object on the campus of Manchester University.  They are the Administration Building, Ikenberry Hall, and Oakwood Hall. The Administration Building consists of the -story, Second Empire style Baumgerdner Hall (1889); -story, Second Empire style, Bible School (1895); with the Tudor Revival style connecting the two older buildings (1920-1921).  The Administration Building consists of a four-story central tower with three-story flanking wings.  Oakwood Hall, originally the Women's Dormitory, was built in 1898 with an addition built in 1916 and a Bungalow / American Craftsman style addition in 1926. Ikenberry Hall, originally the Men's Dormitory, was built in 1906, and is a -story, Classical Revival style orange brick building.  The district also includes the two-tier, cast iron college fountain (1924).

It was listed on the National Register of Historic Places in 1990.

References

Historic districts on the National Register of Historic Places in Indiana
University and college buildings on the National Register of Historic Places in Indiana
Neoclassical architecture in Indiana
Second Empire architecture in Indiana
Tudor Revival architecture in Indiana
Bungalow architecture in Indiana
Historic districts in Wabash County, Indiana
National Register of Historic Places in Wabash County, Indiana